Ambulyx wildei is a species of moth of the  family Sphingidae. It is known from Papua New Guinea and Queensland.

The wingspan is about 110 mm. It is similar to Ambulyx substrigilis but the submarginal line of the forewing upperside is running closer to the margin. Females are deeper brown than males.

References

Ambulyx
Moths described in 1891
Moths of New Guinea
Moths of Australia